Doraha is a 1967 Pakistani musical romance film. The film become remarkable due to its music.

At the box office, the film failed to become a big hit, as it was expected, but it later gained more importance after several years, especially during the 1980s and 1990s due to its superb music and hit songs. The film was produced by Sohail Rana and Pervaiz Malik and was also directed by Pervaiz Malik.

Cast
 Waheed Murad
 Shamim Ara
 Deeba
 Ibrahim Nafees 
 Talish

Release
The film was released by United Talents on 25 August 1967 on cinemas of Karachi and Lahore. During the same year, Doraha got tough competition from other successful films like Chakori, Lakhon Mein Aik, Darshan and Aag.

Music
The music of the film is composed by Sohail Rana. The songs of Doraha, particularly, Bhooli hui hoon daastan ... , Mujhe tum nazar se gira tau rahe ho ... Haan isi more par ... Tumhein kaise bata doon ... and Ajnabi zara souch lo ... became very popular on the Radio at that time. The evergreen songs of the film were written by Masroor Anwar and mostly sung by Ahmed Rushdi and Mala. Only one song was recorded in Mehdi Hassan's voice. Waheed Murad declared Rushdi's song, "Bhooli hui hoon daastan", his favorite song. The film Doraha proved to be a milestone in Ahmed Rushdi's career.

Tumhen kaise bata doon by Ahmed Rushdi
Bhooli hui hoon daastan by Ahmed Rushdi
Bhooli hui hoon daastan by Ahmed Rushdi and Mala
Mujhe tum nazar se gira tau rahe ho by Mehdi Hassan
Haan isi mor par by Ahmed Rushdi
Ajnabi zara souch lo by Ahmed Rushdi
Koi mere dil mein by Mala
Wafaaon ka badla by Mala
Ae chand zara ruk jaana by Mala

References

External links

1960s Urdu-language films
Pakistani black-and-white films
Pakistani romantic drama films
1967 films
Films scored by Sohail Rana
Urdu-language Pakistani films